Philip Marlowe is a 1959–1960 half-hour ABC crime series, featuring Philip Carey as Marlowe, the fictional detective created by Raymond Chandler.

NBC-TV financed the original pilot for a Marlowe series starring Carey, but it sold the program and Carey to ABC, which revamped it.

The show debuted on October 6, 1959, with the episode: "The Ugly Duckling" with Virginia Gregg and Rhys Williams.

The program's lack of success was attributed to its similarity to other contemporary detective series.

Sponsors were Brown & Williamson and American Home Products. The series had 26 episodes.

Cast 
 Philip Carey as Philip Marlowe
 William Schallert as Lt. Manny Harris
 Ed Kemmer as Ralph Craig

References 

A Reader's Guide to Raymond Chandler by Toby Widdicombe.

External links
 

1950s American crime television series
1960s American crime television series
1959 American television series debuts
1960 American television series endings
American Broadcasting Company original programming
American detective television series
Television series by Mark Goodson-Bill Todman Productions